Trigonostoma kilburni is a species of sea snail, a marine gastropod mollusc in the family Cancellariidae, the nutmeg snails.

The specific name kilburni is in honor of South African malacologist Richard Neil Kilburn.

Description

Distribution
South Africa

References

Cancellariidae
Gastropods described in 2000